Aleksander Korcz (born 14 May 1975) is a Polish former field hockey player who competed in the 2000 Summer Olympics.

References

External links

 
 
 

1975 births
Living people
Polish male field hockey players
Olympic field hockey players of Poland
Field hockey players at the 2000 Summer Olympics
Sportspeople from Warsaw